Artnet.com is an art market website. It is operated by Artnet Worldwide Corporation, which has headquarters in New York City, in the United States, and is owned by Artnet AG, a German publicly traded company based in Berlin that is listed on the Frankfurt Stock Exchange. The company increased revenues by 25.3% to 17.3 million EUR in 2015 compared with a year before.

Company history 

The company was founded as Centrox Corporation in 1989 by Pierre Sernet, a French collector who developed database software which allowed images of artworks to be associated with market prices. Hans Neuendorf, a German art dealer, began to invest in the company in the 1990s; he became chairman in 1992 and chief executive officer in 1995. That same year, the name was changed to Artnet Worldwide Corporation. It was taken over by Artnet AG in 1998. Neuendorf's son, Jacob Pabst, became chief executive officer in July 2012.

Website 
Artnet operates an international research and trading platform for the art market, including works of fine art, decorative arts and design. Its services allow users to research art, contact galleries directly, and attain price transparency in the art market. The platform caters to art dealers as well as buyers.

In 2008, Artnet launched the first online auctions platform exclusively for works of art. In 2015, the site saw a 120% increase in new registrations, rising sell-through rates, and a notable increase in numbers of lots sold.

A French version of the site, artnet.fr, was launched in October 2008. It included a French-language magazine which offers a critical overview of the art market in France.

In February 2014, the company launched a 24-hour news site, Artnet News. Benjamin Genocchio, former editorial director of Louise Blouin Media, was appointed editor-in-chief.

Services 
Artnet's primary service is online auctions. The Artnet Fine Art and Design Price Database and the Artnet Decorative Art Price Database contain over 10 million auction sale results dating back to 1985 from over 1700 international auction houses. Market value and long-term price developments of artworks can be researched online.

An additional product is the Artnet online Gallery Network, an online platform that connects galleries and collectors from around the world. With over 35,000 artists and 2,200 international galleries worldwide, it is the largest network of its kind, and generates inquiries from both collectors and first-time buyers.

Subscribing galleries can list works for sale on the site.

Collaborations 
In 2004, Artnet and the international auction house Sotheby's began a collaboration.
A collaboration with Art Basel/Art Basel Miami Beach was launched in 2007.

References 

Companies based in Berlin
Companies based in New York City
Online databases
Art websites